Rampart Ridge is a prominent broken ridge on the west side of the Royal Society Range, standing north of Rutgers Glacier and extending from The Spire to Bishop Peak. Surveyed and given this descriptive name in February 1957 by the New Zealand Northern Survey Party of the Commonwealth Trans-Antarctic Expedition, 1956–58.

It was named by the Advisory Committee on Antarctic Names (US-ACAN) (1994) in association with Rampart Ridge.

It was surveyed and named in 1957 by the New Zealand party of the CTAE.

References 

Ridges of Victoria Land
Scott Coast